The Albert Hall Museum in Jaipur is the oldest museum of the state and functions as the state museum of Rajasthan, India. The building is situated in Ram Niwas garden outside the city wall opposite New gate and is a fine example of Indo-Saracenic architecture. It is also called the Government Central Museum. It was considered one of the best 19th century museums for the variety of its collections. It was renovated in 2008 and reopened as and one of the most advanced museums in India.

History 
The building was designed by  Samuel Swinton Jacob, assisted by Mir Tujumool Hoosein, and was opened as public museum in 1887. Maharaja Ram Singh initially wanted this building to be a town hall, but his successor, Madho Singh II, decided it should be a museum for the art of Jaipur and included as part of the new Ram Nivas Garden. 

It is named after King Edward VII (Albert Edward), during whose visit to the city as the Prince of Wales its foundation stone was laid, on 6 February 1876. The museums founders collected the best exampples of many crafts and sometimes even got some pieces manufactured. Colonel Tomas H. Hendley was given the responsibility of curating the collection. Maharaja amd Hendley were helped in realisation of their vision by a young engineer, Samuel swinton Jacob, who was heading the Public Works department. "Hendley's meticulously compiled ledger-entry of every collected item is the backbone of our inventory and an important source material to this day."

Albert Hall Museum grew out of an industrial crafts collection that Hendley had pit together for the grand Jaipur Exhibition of 1883. Thie precious collection was housed in the magnificent building called Albert Hall. Hendley introduced the appointment of guides and demonstrators to conduct informed tours, a pioneering inititaive that was adopted by museums worldwide. Rajasthan was under princely rule and the practice of purdah (veil) for women was widespread in the region. In this context, it is worth noting that every Friday was reserved for women visitors. For many such innovative museum practices, Albert Hall became famous and many of its features were highly appreciated even in the West but the major attraction of the museum remain its exahustive collection of induatrial art and other exquisite pieces. The collections owe much to the vision, inspiration, and efforts of Maharaja Sawai Ram Singh II and Mahraja Sawai Madho Singh II, and to Hendley and Jacob.

Collection 
The museum has a rich collection of artifacts including paintings, jewelry, carpets, ivory, stone, metal sculptures, and works in crystal. The collection includes coins from the Gupta, Kushan, Delhi Sultanate, Mughal and British periods. 

The superb collection is a result of efforts of Hendley who wanted to preserve local skills and crafts and showcase the best craftsmanship of other places for the people of Jaipur. A repository of 19,000 objects was collected by Hendley, including arms and armour, sculpture, international art from Japan, Sri Lanka, Myanmar, Hungary, Germany, Austria etc, pottery, carpets, jewellery, musical instruments, ivory, woodwork, and stone work. The Egyptian collection houses many objects.  An Egyptian mummy is the main attraction of this museum. The 17th century Persian garden carpet and many ancient sculptures are coveted treasures of the museum. Numerous brass and metal objects were acquired for the collection. Many of them were replicas of the Jaipur Exhibits at Imperial Institute of London and others were purchased at the Punjab Exhibition of 1893-94 in Lahore. The collection is divided into many galleries - pottery collection being the largest and most varied housing exquisite samples from many regions of Indai as well as both western and oriental world.

Building 
The museum building is made of marble and stone. The building was expanded specifically with a museum in mind. The outer walls of the building are painted with scenes from ancient civilizations. The upper part of the courtyard has extracts from religious texts, such as the Quran, the Bible, and Indian epics, inscribed on the walls. Six scenes from Mahabharata and Ramayana depicted in colourful paintings are on the walls. The six-panel set includes the epic narratives of the great gambling scene, abduction of the white horse, Damayanti's Swayamvara, Sacrifice of King Mewardhwaja, and marriage of Bhikya to Chandrahas.  These murals are copied from the 16th century manuscript of Razmnama, the Persian translation of Mahabharata by 19th century copyists. Albert Hall captured the imagination of experts, elites, the public and artists alike. Rudyard Kipling succinctly expressed a scholarly appreciation for the museum in Journal of Indian Art and Industry, dated 5th January 1885, "Every foot of it, from the domes of the roof to the cool green chunam (quicklime) daoes and the carving of the rims of the fountains in the courtyard, was worth studying."

Gallery 

Aerial View of Albert Hall

References

External links 

 

Albert Hall Jaipur Complete Guide

1887 establishments in India
Art museums and galleries in India
Museums established in 1887
Museums in Jaipur
Samuel Swinton Jacob buildings
Tourist attractions in Jaipur